Pedro Telmo Zarraonandía Montoya (20 January 1921 – 23 February 2006), known as Telmo Zarra, was a Spanish football forward. He spent the majority of his career at Athletic Bilbao, from 1940 to 1955, for whom he remains the top scorer in competitive matches with 335 goals.

Zarra signed for Athletic after playing one season for Erandio. He became a prolific goalscorer in his 15 seasons at the club, winning the Pichichi Trophy as the highest scorer in La Liga on six occasions. During his career, Zarra scored a total of 251 league goals, a Spanish record that lasted nearly six decades before being broken by Lionel Messi. His 81 goals in the Copa del Rey remain a record.

Despite his goalscoring records, he only played for Spain 20 times. Even so, he still managed to score 20 goals, including four in one match as Spain beat Switzerland 6–3 on 18 February 1951. He also scored his country's winning goal against England in the 1950 World Cup finals as Spain reached the final four—their best performance in the competition until winning the 2010 FIFA World Cup 60 years later.

After leaving Athletic in 1955, he played for one year with SD Indautxu and another with Barakaldo CF before retiring. He died of a heart attack on 24 February 2006, aged 85. The Zarra Trophy for the highest-scoring Spaniard in La Liga is awarded in his memory.

Life

Childhood and first steps
Zarra was born on 20 January 1921 at the Asúa train station in Erandio, Biscay. He was the son of Telmo Zarraonandía, an engineer and head of Asúa station, and Tomasa Montoya. Zarra was the seventh of ten children, five of them boys.

When he was young, Zarra used to play football with his neighbours. While other children had homemade or improvised balls, Zarra had access to a real ball, as two of his brothers played football in La Liga with Arenas de Getxo: Tomás, a goalkeeper and the oldest sibling, and Domingo, who died during the Spanish Civil War.

His father did not like Zarra playing football, because "it was enough with two brothers in the practice of this game." But Zarra liked the sport and began playing for several local teams, including Asia and Pitoberese. At that time, he was nicknamed "Telmito the fearful", as he would play cautiously, being ashamed and self-conscious of his skill.

Zarra signed his first professional contract with SD Erandio Club of the Second Division, and was incorporated into team during the 1937–38 season. Later he was recruited to a team from Biscay to play a friendly match against a team assembled from Guipuzcoa, during which Zarra scored seven goals in a 9–0 win.

Around this time, Athletic Bilbao was looking for players to rebuild the team, which had been disbanded years before in the chaos caused by the Civil War. The team began recruiting young, promising players from Erandio for their team for the 1940–41 season.

Professional stage and early successes
Zarra debuted with Athletic Club on 29 September 1940, in a league match against Valencia CF. The game ended in a 2–2 draw, with Zarraonandía scoring both goals for his team (including his first league goal, scored 17 minutes into the game).

During the 1941–42 season Zarra temporarily left Athletic Bilbao to join the army. He was dispatched to Ceuta, and played some friendly matches with the team there. Upon his return to Bilbao, Zarra experienced one of the biggest disappointments of his career while playing in the final of the Copa del Rey against Barcelona. They had reached the end of normal time and neither team had managed to score. During extra time, Zarra had an opportunity to score against rival goalkeeper Miró, but he missed the shot; consequently, Barça won the match and Cup.

The 1942–43 campaign was one of the most important for both Zarra and Athletic Bilbao. Athletic reached the Copa del Rey final after having defeated Atlético Madrid and FC Valencia. There they met Real Madrid and this time, Zarra was able to redeem himself by scoring the only goal in the final, winning the year's cup in addition to the league title.

Zarra's first serious injury occurred in the 1943–44 season in a match against Barcelona. He broke his clavicle and was unable to play for a while. Once recovered, Zarra was able to return to the pitch and celebrate with a Copa del Rey title, helping Athletic record a 2–0 win over Valencia.

In the 1944–45 season, with Athletic again facing Valencia in the Copa del Rey final, four minutes from time a Valencia player fell to the ground. Zarra made a move to trample the fallen player, as a joke, and he was sent off by the referee. This expulsion was the first and only he suffered throughout his career. Despite this, Athletic took the title that year thanks to a goal by Rafael Iriondo that made the score 3–2.

Zarra experienced the best moments of his career in the 1944–45 season  with his first Pichichi Trophy, marking 20 goals scored in 26 matches. He would go on to win this award on five other occasions (1946, 1947, 1950, 1951 and 1953).

1945–1953
On 11 March 1945, Zarra was selected by the Spanish coach Jacinto Quincoces to join the Spanish national team for a friendly match against Portugal in Lisbon. On 6 May of that year he played against Portugal again, and scored two of the four goals that won the match.

On 28 May 1950, Zarra again played in another Copa del Rey final, this time against Real Valladolid after Valencia CF was disbanded. During the final, he  scored four of the goals that won the game for his team. He opened the scoring at 14 minutes, but by end of regulation time the match was drawn. During extra time, Zarra scored a hat trick as Athletic won the cup. With those four against Valladolid, Zarra holds the record for highest number of goals scored in a Cup final.

Once qualified, the Spanish team played matches against the United States, Chile, and England in the 1950 FIFA World Cup. He scored one of the goals in a 2–0 win over Chile in the second match. Zarra referred to the third game, against England, as "the game of the century." Zarra's goal past the English goalkeeper Bert Williams won the match and sent Spain through at the expense of England. This goal, perhaps the most famous scored by Zarra, gave the victory to the Spanish team in their first World Cup semi-finals.

In the 1950–51 season Zarra was able to score 38 goals in 30 league games, a Spanish record that stood until the 2010–11 season. This record was also achieved by the Mexican Hugo Sánchez, although he scored his 38 goals over the course of 38 matches.

During the 1951–52 season Zarra suffered his most serious injury of his career, on 25 November 1951 in a game against Atlético Madrid, when the opposing goalkeeper fell on Zarra's leg. An operation was required for full recovery, which kept him out for the rest of the season. On his return in the 1952–53 season, he played 29 games and scored on 25 occasions, giving a scoring average of 0.86 from both seasons.

Last years and retirement
On 29 April 1954, Zarra received a tribute and benefit match in Madrid (played between two regional selections) in recognition of his long career in Spanish football. This event was attended by several VIPs from the world of football, including Alfredo Di Stéfano, Antonio Puchades, Estanislao Basora, Piru Gaínza, Eduardo Manchon, and Cesar Lesmes.

Zarra was nearing the end of this career and watched as young, promising Athletic players took over his role on the team, including a young player named Eneko Arieta, who would become his successor.

Zarra ended his Athletic career at the end of the 1954–55 season. From then on he devoted himself to playing for several teams in the Second Division until his official retirement from the game in 1957; however, he continued playing football with the veteran players of Biscay, donating the money collected from these games to charities.

Career statistics

Club

International
Scores and results list Spain's goal tally first, score column indicates score after each Zarra goal.

Honours
Athletic Bilbao
 La Liga: 1942–43
 Copa del Rey: 1943, 1944, 1944–45, 1949–50, 1955
 Copa Eva Duarte: 1950

Individual
 Pichichi Trophy: 1944–45, 1945–46, 1946–47, 1949–50, 1950–51, 1952–53
 Golden Pichichi Trophy: 2003

Decorations
 Sports Merit Medal
 Shiny gold badge of Málaga CF
 Silver badge of Deportivo de La Coruña

Posthumous dedications
 Zarra Trophy
 Memorial bust at Lezama training centre

Records
 Top scorer in the history of the Copa del Rey (81 goals)
 Top scorer in the history of Athletic Club (332 goals)
 Second most Pichichi trophies (6) 
 Most goals in a Copa del Rey Final (4 – 1950)
 Top scorer in the Basque derby vs Real Sociedad (14)
 Top scorer in El Viejo Clásico vs Real Madrid (22)

References

External links
 
 
 

1921 births
2006 deaths
People from Erandio
Spanish footballers
Association football forwards
Spain international footballers
Footballers from the Basque Country (autonomous community)
La Liga players
Athletic Bilbao footballers
Barakaldo CF footballers
1950 FIFA World Cup players
Pichichi Trophy winners
SD Indautxu footballers
Sportspeople from Biscay
SD Erandio Club players